Mexichromis circumflava is a species of sea slug or dorid nudibranch, a marine gastropod mollusk in the family Chromodorididae.

Distribution
This nudibranch is known only from Madang in Papua New Guinea.

Description
Mexichromis circumflava has a white body, an orange-lined mantle and orange gills and rhinophores.

Like all Chromodorids, this species feeds on sponges.

References

Chromodorididae
Gastropods described in 1990